Kelsey DiClaudio (born July 22, 1997) is an athlete who participates in women's ice sledge hockey. A member of the United States women's national ice sledge hockey team, she competed in the first-ever IPC Ice Sledge Hockey Women's International Cup in 2014. Prior to competing with the national women's team, DiClaudio competed with men on the Pittsburgh Mighty Penguins.

Playing career
During October 2010, DiClaudio and the Pittsburgh Penguins men's ice sledge hockey team participated in the semi-finals of the first annual USA Hockey Sled Classic in 2010.

Of note, DiClaudio was in attendance at the Women's Sports Foundation's 35th Annual Salute to Women In Sports awards. The event took place in New York City on October 15, 2014.

U.S. Women's National Sled Hockey Team
Competing at the IPC Ice Sledge Hockey Women's International Cup from November 7–9, 2014 in Brampton, Ontario, Canada, DiClaudio helped the United States to the gold medal. Playing against Canada in the final, DiClaudio contributed with four goals and one assist in the 5–1 victory DiClaudio would contribute 23 points (16 goals, 7 assists) at the event.

U.S. Men's National Development Sled Hockey Team
DiCladio was the first woman named to the U.S. Men's National Development Sled Hockey Team in July 2014. She netted her first goal in international play on March 11, 2015, as part of a 3–0 shutout against Team Canada in Calgary, AB, CAN.

On July 17, 2015, DiClaudio was named to the 2015–16 U.S. Men's National Development Sled Hockey Team for the second consecutive season.

Awards and honors
 Leading Scorer, 2014 IPC Ice Sledge Hockey Women's International Cup
 Allianz Athlete of the Month (November 2014)

References

Living people
American sledge hockey players
1997 births
People with paraplegia
People with spina bifida